Budapest Live is an album released in 1984 by Manfred Mann's Earth Band. The album was recorded on the "Somewhere in Europe" tour in 1983 in support of the "Somewhere in Afrika" album, and despite its title, also featured recordings from the Dominion Theatre in London. It was the final Earth Band album to appear on the Bronze label and also the last album recorded with Steve Waller and Matt Irving.

The album has long since been criticized by fans for being radically edited down from the actual gig length, thereby losing a lot of live staples ("Martha's Madman", "You Angel You") and many songs now having instrumental passages shortened or completely removed ("Davy's on the Road Again", "Mighty Quinn" and "Demolition Man", the latter being around ten minutes in concert). The cassette release added two more recordings from the concert - parts 1 and 2 of the "Africa Suite" and "Don't Kill It Carol".

The album was not released in the United States, but broadcast on the King Biscuit Flower Hour program. Since the band had changed line-ups in the meantime and scored a hit with the single "Runner", a "live" version (recorded in the studio, with fake crowd noise) was added to this version of the concert. The b-side of the "Runner" single had contained the track "No Transkei", which was yet another re-titled version of "To Bantustan?" (the second part of the "Africa Suite", called "Where Do They Send Them" on the Budapest Live cassette), again taken from the Budapest concerts.

These three tracks were all included on the 1999 CD release as bonus tracks. The 1999 CD also altered the running order, making "Lies" (introduced by Chris Thompson saying "Hello Budapest!") the opener (although this is not reflected on the packaging) and crossfading most of the audience noise. The remaster from the 40th Anniversary Box Set reverted to the original LP order and omitted the bonus tracks.

In 2007, a DVD was released of the TV broadcast, which includes all originally played tracks in original length except "Eyes of Nostradamus" and "Davy's on the Road Again".

Track listing (original LP)

Side one
"Spirits in the Night" (Bruce Springsteen) – 5:54
"Demolition Man" (Gordon Sumner) – 4:14
"For You" (Springsteen) – 6:36
"Davy's on the Road Again" (John Simon, Robbie Robertson) – 4:37

Side two
"Lies (Through The 80's)" (Denny Newman) – 4:30
"Blinded by the Light" (Springsteen) – 7:38
"Redemption Song (No Kwazulu)" (Bob Marley) – 3:22
"Mighty Quinn" (Bob Dylan) – 4:00

Cassette bonus tracks
"Brothers and Sisters of Africa/Where Do They Send Them" (Manfred Mann) – 5:24
"Don't Kill It Carol" (Mike Heron) – 4:55

Track listing (1999 CD re-issue)

"Lies (Through The 80's)" (Denny Newman) – 4:30
"Spirits in the Night" (Bruce Springsteen) – 5:54
"Demolition Man" (Gordon Sumner) – 4:14
"For You" (Springsteen) – 6:36
"Davy's on the Road Again" (John Simon, Robbie Robertson) – 4:37
"Blinded by the Light" (Springsteen) – 7:38
"Redemption Song (No Kwazulu)" (Bob Marley) – 3:22
"Mighty Quinn" (Bob Dylan) – 4:00

Bonus tracks
"Runner" (Ian Thomas) – 5:02
"No Transkei" (Manfred Mann) – 5:11 [the title for part 2 from the "Runner" single now used for both parts 1 and 2]
"Don't Kill It Carol" (Mike Heron) – 5:21

Track listing (2007 DVD)

"Angels at My Gate" (Mann, Jimme O'Neill, Hirth Martinez)
"Lies (Through The 80's)" (Denny Newman)
"Africa Suite" (Mann)
"Tribal Statistics" (Andy Qunta)
"Martha's Madman" (Lane Tietgen)
"You Angel You" (Dylan)
"For You" (Springsteen)
"Demolition Man" (Gordon Sumner)
"Mighty Quinn" (Bob Dylan)
"Don't Kill It Carol" (Mike Heron)
"Blinded by the Light" (Springsteen)
"Redemption Song (No Kwazulu)" (Bob Marley)

Charts

Personnel

The Earth Band
 Manfred Mann – keyboards, synthesisers, vocals
 John Lingwood – drums
 Steve Waller – guitar, vocals (except "Runner")
 Chris Thompson – vocals, guitar
 Matt Irving – bass, vocals
 Mick Rogers - guitar, vocals on "Runner"

Technical
 John Lingwood, Chris Thompson – producers
 Pete 'Manuel' Carlson – engineer
 Alan Bradshaw – engineer
 Terry "Luigi" Medhurst – mixing engineer
 Simon Porter – photography

References

External links

Manfred Mann's Earth Band albums
1984 live albums
Bronze Records live albums